Tropical cyclones are ranked on one of five tropical cyclone intensity scales, according to their maximum sustained winds and which tropical cyclone basins they are located in. Only a few scales of classifications are used officially by the meteorological agencies monitoring the tropical cyclones, but other scales also exist, such as accumulated cyclone energy, the Power Dissipation Index, the Integrated Kinetic Energy Index, and the Hurricane Severity Index.

Tropical cyclones that develop in the Northern Hemisphere are unofficially classified by the warning centres on one of three intensity scales. Tropical cyclones or subtropical cyclones that exist within the North Atlantic Ocean or the North-eastern Pacific Ocean are classified as either tropical depressions or tropical storms. Should a system intensify further and become a hurricane, then it will be classified on the Saffir–Simpson hurricane wind scale, and is based on the estimated maximum sustained winds over a 1-minute period. In the Western Pacific, the ESCAP/WMO Typhoon Committee uses four separate classifications for tropical cyclones that exist within the basin, which are based on the estimated maximum sustained winds over a 10-minute period.

The India Meteorological Department's scale uses 7 different classifications for systems within the North Indian Ocean, and are based on the systems estimated 3-minute maximum sustained winds. Tropical cyclones that develop in the Southern Hemisphere are only officially classified by the warning centres on one of two scales, which are both based on 10-minute sustained wind speeds: The Australian tropical cyclone intensity scale is used to classify systems within the Australian or South Pacific tropical cyclone basin. The scale used to classify systems in the South-West Indian Ocean is defined by Météo-France for use in various French territories, including New Caledonia and French Polynesia.

The definition of sustained winds recommended by the World Meteorological Organization (WMO) and used by most weather agencies is that of a 10-minute average at a height of 10 m (33 ft) above the sea surface. The scale used by Regional Specialized Meteorological Centre (RSMC)  New Delhi applies a 3-minute averaging period, and the Australian scale is based on both 3-second wind gusts and maximum sustained winds averaged over a 10-minute interval. These differences make direct comparisons between basins difficult.

Within all basins tropical cyclones are named when the sustained winds reach at least .

Background

Tropical cyclones are defined as being warm cored, non-frontal synoptic cyclones, that develop over tropical or subtropical waters, with organized atmospheric convection and have a definite cyclonic surface wind circulation. They are classified by the wind speeds located around the circulation centre and are ranked, by the World Meteorological Organization's Regional Specialized Meteorological Centers on one of five tropical cyclone scales. The scale used for a particular tropical cyclone depends on what basin the system is located in; with for example the Saffir–Simpson hurricane wind scale and the Australian tropical cyclone intensity scales both used in the Western Hemisphere. All of the scales rank tropical cyclones using their maximum sustained winds, which are either observed, measured or estimated using various techniques, over a period between one and ten minutes.

Atlantic, Eastern and Central Pacific

Tropical cyclones that occur within the Northern Hemisphere to the east of the anti-meridian, are officially monitored by either the National Hurricane Center or the Central Pacific Hurricane Center. Within the region a tropical cyclone is defined to be a warm cored, non-frontal synoptic disturbance, that develops over tropical or subtropical waters, with organized atmospheric convection and a closed well defined circulation centre. The region also defines a subtropical cyclone as a non-frontal low pressure disturbance, that has the characteristics of both tropical and extratropical cyclones.

Also, it will be assigned a tropical cyclone number (or TC number for short) comprising an officially spelled-out number (from ONE to THIRTY or less; these numbers are not recycled until next year) followed by (except for North Atlantic systems) a hyphen and a suffix letter ("-E" for East Pacific, "-C" for Central Pacific); a two-digit (plus any suffix) abbreviation (like TD 08 for North Atlantic depression EIGHT, TD 21E for East Pacific depression TWENTYONE-E, or TD 03C for Central Pacific depression THREE-C) is also generated for bulletin and other automated purposes.

However, if a tropical disturbance is capable of producing tropical storm or hurricane conditions on land within 48 hours, then advisories will be initiated and it will be classified as a potential tropical cyclone (PTC) with a two-digit PTC number (for example, PTC-09 or PTC-15E) that otherwise looks identical to a TC number.

A post tropical cyclone is a system that has weakened, into a remnant low or has dissipated and formal advisories are usually discontinued at this stage. However, advisories may continue if the post tropical cyclone poses a significant threat to life and property. They may also continue if the remnants of the system have a chance of regeneration and producing tropical storm or hurricane-force winds over land within 48 hours.

The SSHS was originally created using both wind speed and storm surge, but since the relationship between wind speed and storm surge is not necessarily definite, the scale was changed to the "Saffir–Simpson Hurricane Wind Scale" (SSHWS), based entirely on wind speed.

Although increasing echelons of the scale correspond to stronger winds, the rankings are not absolute in terms of effects. Lower-category storms can inflict greater damage than higher-category storms, depending on factors such as local terrain, population density and total rainfall. For instance, a Category 2 hurricane that strikes a major urban area will likely do more damage than a large Category 5 hurricane that strikes a mostly rural region. In fact, tropical systems of less than hurricane strength, as in the case of Tropical Storm Allison, can produce significant damage and human casualties, especially from flooding and landslides.

Historically, the term great hurricane was used to describe storms that possessed winds of at least , large radii (over 160 km / 100 mi) and that caused large amounts of destruction. This term fell into disuse after the introduction of the Saffir–Simpson scale in the early 1970s.

Western Pacific

Tropical cyclones that occur within the Northern Hemisphere between the anti-meridian and 100°E are officially monitored by the Japan Meteorological Agency (JMA, RSMC Tokyo). Within the region a tropical cyclone is defined to be a non-frontal synoptic scale cyclone originating over tropical or sub-tropical waters, with organized convection and a definite cyclonic surface wind circulation.

The China Meteorological Administration, the Hong Kong Observatory (HKO), PAGASA and the JMA, all divide the typhoon category further for domestic purposes. The JMA divides the typhoon category into three categories, with a 10-minute maximum wind speed below  assigned for the (strong) typhoon category.

In addition to the national meteorological services of each nation, the United States' Joint Typhoon Warning Center (JTWC) monitors the basin, and issues warnings on significant tropical cyclones for the United States Government, assigning them two-digit TC numbers (with suffix "W"). These warnings use a 1-minute sustained wind speed and can be compared to the Saffir–Simpson hurricane wind scale; however, the JTWC uses their own scale for intensity classifications in this basin. These classifications are Tropical Depression, Tropical Storm, Typhoon, and Super Typhoon. The United States' Joint Typhoon Warning Center (JTWC) unofficially classifies typhoons with wind speeds of at least —the equivalent of a strong Category 4 storm on the Saffir–Simpson scale—as super typhoons. Also, when a tropical depression is upgraded to tropical storm and named by the JMA, the JTWC appends the international name (parenthesized) to its TC number (i.e., 2018 tropical depression TWENTY-W, abbr. TD 20W, became Tropical Storm Bebinca, but was referred to as TS 20W (BEBINCA) in JTWC advisories); however, in cases when the JTWC upgrades a depression to tropical storm without the JMA following suit (due to the differences between JTWC and JMA wind-speed scales), the spelled-out number (without the suffix) is parenthesized and appended to the TC number as placeholder name, as in TS 16W (SIXTEEN), until JMA upgrades and names it, on which case the name replaces the placeholder.

In addition, the Taiwan Central Weather Bureau has its own scale in Chinese but uses the Typhoon Committee scale in English.

North Indian Ocean

Any tropical cyclone that develops within the North Indian Ocean between 100°E and 45°E is monitored by the India Meteorological Department (IMD, RSMC New Delhi). Within the region a tropical cyclone is defined as being a non frontal synoptic scale cyclone, that originates over tropical or subtropical waters with organized convection and a definite cyclonic surface wind circulation. The highest classification used in the North Indian Ocean is a Super Cyclonic Storm, which have hurricane-force winds of above .

Historically, a system has been classified as a depression if it is an area where the barometric pressure is low compared with its surroundings. Other classifications historically used include: cyclonic storm where the winds did not exceed force 10 on the Beaufort scale and a Cyclone where the winds are either force 11 and 12 on the Beaufort scale. Between 1924 and 1988, tropical cyclones were classified into four categories: depression, deep depression, cyclonic storms and severe cyclonic storms. During 1999 the categories Very Severe Cyclonic Storm and Super Cyclonic Storm were introduced, while the severe cyclonic storm with a core of hurricane winds category was eliminated. During 2015 another modification to the intensity scale took place, with the IMD calling a system with 3-minute maximum sustained wind speeds between : an extremely severe cyclonic storm.

The United States Joint Typhoon Warning Center also monitors the basin, and issues warnings on significant tropical cyclones on behalf of the United States Government, also assigning them TC numbers as in all other basins above (albeit in an unofficial manner for this and subsequent basins; cyclones originating in the Arabian Sea are assigned suffix "A" while those in the Bay of Bengal get suffix "B"). These warnings use a 1-minute sustained wind speed and can be compared to the Saffir–Simpson hurricane wind scale, however, regardless of intensity in this basin the JTWC labels all systems as tropical cyclones with TC numbers (optionally appended with international names or placeholders in parentheses, as done for typhoons above).

South-West Indian Ocean

Any tropical cyclone that develops within the Southern Hemisphere between Africa and 90°E is monitored by Météo-France's La Réunion tropical cyclone centre (MFR, RSMC La Réunion). Within the region a tropical disturbance is defined to be a non-frontal synoptic scale low-pressure area, originating over tropical or sub-tropical waters with organized convection and definite cyclonic surface wind circulation with the average wind speed estimated to be not exceeding .

A tropical disturbance is MFR's generic term for a non-frontal area of low pressure that has organized convection and definite cyclonic surface wind circulation.

A system is designated as a tropical depression or a subtropical depression when it reaches wind speeds above .  If a tropical depression reach wind speeds of  then it will be classified as a moderate tropical storm and assigned a name by either the Sub Regional Center in Mauritius or Madagascar. No matter how strong a subtropical system is in this basin, it is always designated as a subtropical depression.

At the tenth RA I tropical cyclone committee held during 1991, it was recommended that the intensity classifications be changed ahead of the 1993–94 tropical cyclone season. Specifically it was decided that the classifications: Weak Tropical Depression, Moderate Tropical Depression and Severe Tropical Depression would be changed to Tropical Depression, Moderate Tropical Storm and Severe Tropical Storm. This change was implemented ahead of the 1993–94 tropical cyclone season.

The United States Joint Typhoon Warning Center also monitors the basin, and issues warnings on significant tropical cyclones on behalf of the United States Government; these systems are unofficially assigned TC numbers with suffix "S" (which spans the whole South Indian Ocean, including both BMKG and BoM areas of responsibility west of 135°E). These warnings use a 1-minute sustained wind speed and can be compared to the Saffir–Simpson hurricane wind scale, however, regardless of intensity in this basin the JTWC labels all systems as tropical cyclones with TC numbers (plus any parenthesized names or placeholders, like typhoons and North Indian Ocean cyclones above).

Australia and Fiji

Tropical cyclones that occur within the Southern Hemisphere to the east of 90°E are officially monitored by one or more tropical cyclone warning centres. These are run by the Fiji Meteorological Service, New Zealand's MetService, Indonesia's Badan Meteorologi, Klimatologi, dan Geofisika, Papua New Guinea's National Weather Service and the Australian Bureau of Meteorology. Once this definition has been met then all of the centres name the system and start to use the Australian tropical cyclone intensity scale, which measures tropical cyclones using a five category system based on 10-minute maximum sustained winds.

For systems below tropical cyclone strength there are various terms used, including Tropical Disturbance, Tropical Low and Tropical Depression. A tropical disturbance is defined as being a non-frontal system of synoptic scale originating over the tropics, with persistent enhanced convection or some indication of a circulation. A tropical depression or tropical low is a disturbance with a defined circulation, where the central position can be estimated, and the maximum 10-minute average wind speed is less than  near the centre. The FMS numbers these systems when they have a potential to develop into a tropical cyclone or persist to cause significant impact to life and property, within its area of responsibility and have been analysed for the previous 24 hours. The Australian tropical cyclone intensity scale was introduced by the BoM, ahead of the 1989–90 cyclone season.

The United States Joint Typhoon Warning Center also monitors the basin, and issues warnings on significant tropical cyclones on behalf of the United States Government; these systems are unofficially assigned TC numbers with either suffix "S" (if originating west of 135°E; spans the whole South Indian Ocean, including MFR's area of responsibility) or suffix "P" (if east of 135°E; spans the whole South Pacific Ocean, merging BoM, PNG-NWS, FMS, and MSNZ AORs together). These warnings use a 1-minute sustained wind speed and can be compared to the Saffir–Simpson hurricane wind scale, however, regardless of intensity in these basins the JTWC labels all systems as tropical cyclones with TC numbers (plus any names or placeholders parenthesized, as for typhoons and Indian Ocean cyclones above).

Alternative scales
There are other scales that are not officially used by any of the Regional Specialized Meteorological Centres or the Tropical Cyclone Warning Centres. However they are used by other organizations, such as the National Oceanic and Atmospheric Administration. An example of such scale is the Integrated Kinetic Energy index, which measures the destructive potential of the storm surge on the coast; it works on a scale that ranges from one to six, with six having the highest destructive potential.

Accumulated cyclone energy (ACE) is used by the National Oceanic and Atmospheric Administration and other agencies to express the activity of individual tropical cyclones that are above tropical storm strength and entire tropical cyclone seasons. It is calculated by taking the squares of the estimated maximum sustained velocity of every active tropical storm (wind speed 35 knots or higher) at six-hour intervals. The numbers are usually divided by 10,000 to make them more manageable. The unit of ACE is 104 kn2, and for use as an index the unit is assumed. As well as being squared for ACE, wind speed can also be cubed, which is referred to as the Power Dissipation Index (PDI).

The Hurricane Severity Index (HSI) is another scale used and rates the severity of all types of tropical and subtropical cyclones based on both the intensity and the size of their wind fields. The HSI is a 0 to 50 point scale, allotting up to 25 points for a tropical cyclone's intensity and up to 25 points for wind field size. Points are awarded on a sliding scale, with the majority of points reserved for hurricane force and greater wind fields.

See also

 Rapid intensification
 Tropical cyclone naming

References

External links
Australian Bureau of Meteorology - Understanding tropical cyclone categories

Regional specialized meteorological centres
US National Hurricane Center – North Atlantic, Eastern Pacific
Central Pacific Hurricane Center  – Central Pacific
Japan Meteorological Agency – NW Pacific
India Meteorological Department – Bay of Bengal and the Arabian Sea
Météo-France – La Reunion – South Indian Ocean from 30°E to 90°E
Fiji Meteorological Service – South Pacific west of 160°E, north of 25° S

Tropical cyclone warning centres
Indonesian Meteorological Department – South Indian Ocean from 90°E to 125°E, north of 10°S
Papua New Guinea's National Weather Service – South Pacific Ocean from 125°E to 160°E, north of 10°S
Australian Bureau of Meteorology . – South Indian Ocean & South Pacific Ocean from 90°E to 160°E, south of 10°S
Meteorological Service of New Zealand Limited – South Pacific west of 160°E, south of 25°S

Hazard scales
Tropical cyclone meteorology
Wind